was daimyō of Owari Domain during early-Edo period Japan.

Biography
Tokugawa Tsunanari was the son of the second daimyō of Owari Domain, Tokugawa Mitsutomo by his official wife, Chiyohime later Reisen-in, the daughter of shōgun Tokugawa Iemitsu. Although Mitsutomo's second son, he was given the position of first son and heir over his elder brother, who had been born to a concubine. He undertook his genpuku ceremony under Shogun Tokugawa Ietsuna on April 5, 1657, and was given the adult name of the "Tsunayoshi". He changed his name to "Tsunanari" to avoid confusion with an uncle of the same name who was daimyō of Tatebayashi Domain. His childhood name was Gorota (五郎太).

On the retirement of his father on April 27, 1693, Tsunanari became the 3rd Tokugawa daimyō of Owari Domain, with 3rd court rank and the courtesy title of Chūnagon. Although officially daimyō, all power remained in the hands of his retired father and Tsunanari spent most of his time in various scholarly pursuits, including starting work on a comprehensive history of Owari Province in 1698. In addition to his official wife (a daughter of court noble Hirohata Tadayki), Tsunanari had 16 concubines, by whom he had a total of 40 children (22 male, 18 female).

Tsunanari died on July 1, 1699, by eating a tainted strawberry, and was succeeded by his 10th son, Tokugawa Yoshimichi. He was posthumously awarded 2nd Court Rank and the courtesy title of Dainagon. His grave is at the Owari Tokugawa clan temple of Kenchū-ji in Nagoya.

Family
 Father: Tokugawa Mitsutomo
 Mother: Tokugawa Chiyohime, daughter of the third shōgun Tokugawa Iemitsu
 Wife: Shinko, daughter of Hirohata Tadayuki
 Concubines:
 Ofuku no Kata later Honjuin (1665–1739)
 Izumi later Senkoin
 Karahashi-dono
 Umezu later Senyoin
 Oyae no Kata
 Osano no Kata
 Kono-dono
 Umekoji-dono
 Odan no Kata
 Otsu no Kata
 Tatsuko no Kata
 Renjoin
 Oako no Kata
 Oman no Kata
 Kurahashi-dono
 Takahita-dono
 Children:
 Gorohachi (1676–1678) by Oyae
 Gen'nosuke (1678–1678) by Osano
 Etsuhime (1679–1681) by Kono
 Tsurumaru (1680–1680) by Umekoji
 Matsunosuke (1682–1683) by Umekoji
 Kikuhime (1684–1685) by Umekoji
 Kitaro (1686–1687) by Umekoji
 Ayahime (1692–1694) by Umekoji
 Bomaru (1693–1693) by Umekoji
 Masahime (1695–1695) by Umekoji
 Hatsuhime (1683–1683) by Odan
 Hachihime (1684–1684) by Otsu
 Kiyohime (1684–1684) by Tatsuko
 Haruhime (1685–1868) by Renjoin
 Daizen (1688–1691) by Renjoin
 Mitsuhime (1690–1691) by Renjoin
 Kametaro (1687–1692) by Senkoin
 Tsunesaburo (1688–1691) by Senkoin
 Tsutahime (1688–1688) by Honjuin
 Tokugawa Yoshimichi by Honjuin
 Itsuhime (1691–1696) by Honjuin
 Iwanosuke (1694–1705) by Honjuin
 Naohime (1688–1689) by Oako
 Harunosuke (1694–1705) by Oako
 Ishimatsu (1692–1694) by Oako
 Yorihime (1692–1694) by Oman
 Chojiro (1694–1697) by Senyoin
 Bohime (1698–1698) by Senyoin
 Sennosuke (1696–1697) by Kurahashi
 Fukuhime (1698–1700) by Kurahashi
 Tokugawa Tsugutomo by Senkoin
 Matsudaira Yoshitaka (1694–1732) by Karahashi
 Matsudaira Michimasa (1696–1730) by Karahashi
 Tokugawa Muneharu by Senyoin
 Kichihime (1697–1701) by Karahashi and adopted by the fifth shōgun Tokugawa Tsunayoshi
 Matsuhime married Maeda Yoshinori by Kurahashi and adopted by the fifth shōgun Tokugawa Tsunayoshi
 Tonosuke (1699–1699) by Takahita

References 
 Papinot, Edmond. (1906) Dictionnaire d'histoire et de géographie du japon. Tokyo: Librarie Sansaisha...Click link for digitized 1906 Nobiliaire du japon (2003)
 The content of much of this article was derived from that of the corresponding article on Japanese Wikipedia.

1652 births
1699 deaths
Tokugawa clan
Lords of Owari
Deaths from food poisoning